Joschka Langenbrinck (born 30 April 1985) is a German politician, currently serving as Member of the Abgeordnetenhaus of Berlin since 27 October 2011 representing the Neukölln 3 constituency for the Social Democratic Party.

Education
Langenbrinck was born in Willich in the state of Nordrhein-Westfalen. He received his Abitur from the St. Bernhard Gymnasium and then studied Political science at the University of Potsdam, graduating with a diploma. While at university, Langenbrinck was active in student politics, serving as a member of the AStA (student committee).

Political career
After completing his education, Langenbrinck was employed on the staff of several German politicians. He has held various roles within the SPD, including terms as Deputy Chair and Spokesperson of the Neukölln SPD. He is a member of a number of local and political organisations and trade unions, including ver.di.

In the 2011 election Langenbrinck was elected to represent the Neukölln 3 constituency. He has taken a particular interested in education, asking 300 questions to the Education Department, attracting criticism from the Education Secretary, a member of his own party.

References

Living people
1985 births
German political scientists
Social Democratic Party of Germany politicians
Members of the Abgeordnetenhaus of Berlin
People from Viersen (district)
University of Potsdam alumni